Shri Bhairavanath Vidya Mandir, Pabal is a high school established in 1956, in Pabal. It is controlled by Shikshan Prasarak Mandal Pabal. The school focuses on the provision of education from 5th to 12th standards. The school is in Marathi medium. Recently, semi-English courses have been started.

The school is situated in Pabal, near ST stand.

Introduction to Basic Technology course is conducted in the school for a division from 8th to 10th standard. The course was started by Dr. Kalbag (founder-director of Vigyan Ashram).

Art, commerce, science, electrical, and automobile are some courses for college students.

See also
 Vigyan Ashram
 Shirur Taluka

References

External links 
 

Schools in Pune district
Educational institutions established in 1956
1956 establishments in Bombay State